Krush is a martial arts entertainment planning and promotion brand established in 2008, currently based in Japan. It is the sister brand of K-1, and has produced numerous future K-1 competitors, such as Takeru Segawa, Tatsuya Tsubakihara and Yuki Egawa. It features events across ten male and three female weight classes.

Current Krush champions

History
Krush was launched in 2008, prior to the death of K-1 FEG, as a collaboration between K-1 and All Japan Kickboxing Federation. It was launched as a feeder organization to K-1, and was accordingly seen as the second tier of K-1 competition.

On June 22, 2009, organization representative Toshio Kaneda was arrested, alongside seven other members of the executive committee. Following their arrests, the AJKF was dissolved. The remaining committee and staff members founded "Good Loser", a parent company which continued organizing events under the Krush brand. Former kickboxer Satoshi Kobayashi was appointed as the general manager.

On July 24, 2009, Krush held their first tournament. The grand prix was scheduled to crown the new lightweight champion and included 16 participants.

On August 8, 2012, Krush signed a partnership agreement with Pancrase. It was the first such agreement in the four year history of the organization up to that point.

It was confirmed in early 2014 that Krush would begin organizing women's fights, as well as female title fights. The first Krush women's champion was crowned on March 17, 2014, when Syuri became the inaugural flyweight champion.

On May 29, 2014, following the bankruptcy of K-1 FEG, K-1 World League was launched (later renamed to K-1 World GP). As such, the two organizations resumed their partnership.

From 2017 onward, cross-promotional events with Chinese organizations such as Wu Lin Feng and GLORY OF HEROS were held every summer, featuring Chinese fighters competing against their Japanese counterparts.

On January 26, 2019 Krush was renamed "K-1 KRUSH FIGHT" to further announce the connection between the two brands. However, on December 7, 2019, it was renamed back to Krush. The aim of renaming the competition back to Krush was to dispel the image of the brand as the second tier of K-1.

Rules
Krush shares the same rule-set as K-1, which is as follows:

 The fights are contested in a ring which is six or more square meters and surrounded by four ropes.
 Only striking techniques such as punches, kicks and knees are allowed. Strikes with the back of the fist are allowed, but not with the elbow or the forearm. Multiple clinch knees are prohibited.
Sweeps, throws, headbutts and strikes with the elbow are prohibited. Furthermore, spitting, biting, groin strikes, strikes to the back of the head, striking after the round has ended or the referee has called for a break, striking while the opponent is knocked down and excessive holding are all considered fouls.
Matches, both regular and title matches, are contested in three three minute rounds. In case of a draw, an extension round is fought.
Matches are scored based of four criteria: 
(1) Number of knockdowns a fighter has scored, with three knockdowns inside of a single round resulting in a technical knockout
(2) Presence or absence of damage to the opponent
(3) The number clean strikes, with strikes which are thrown with fight ending intention scoring more highly than those thrown with the intent of racking up points
(4) Aggressiveness

Events

See also 

 K-1
 List of Krush champions
 List of K-1 champions
 List of kickboxing organizations

References 

K-1
Kickboxing organizations
Sports organizations established in 2008
2008 establishments in Japan
Kickboxing in Japan